Richard William Nesbitt is a Canadian financial executive currently managing KalNes Capital Partners' partner. Previously, he was the president and CEO of Global Risk Institute in Financial Services.  In addition, in cooperation with the London School of Economics, he leads the creation of a new research institute, The Inclusion Initiative At LSE, which is mandated to improve diversity and inclusion in the industry. He is also an adjunct professor at the Rotman School of Management of the University of Toronto. He teaches a Rotman School of Management course entitled "How Banks Work: Management in a New Regulatory Age." Richard is also chair of the advisory board of the Mind-Brain Behaviour Hive at the same university.

Career 
In partnership with Thomas Kalafatis, Richard is the co-founder of KalNes Capital Partners, a private family office that makes various software, technology, and financial investments. Richard was the chief operating officer of Canadian Imperial Bank of Commerce until he retired from the role in September 2014. He became CEO of CIBC World Markets on February 29, 2008.

Until his resignation in January 2008, he was the CEO of TSX Group, which operates the Toronto Stock Exchange and the TSX Venture Exchange. He is on the board of directors of TSX Group, the World Federation of Exchanges, Market Regulation Services, CanDeal, Frontier College and the Prostate Cancer Research Foundation of Canada. Nesbitt was a governor (member of the board of directors) of the Toronto Stock Exchange from 1996 until December 1999.

Previously, Richard served as president and chief operating officer of BayStreetDirect Inc., an Internet-based investment dealer. Before that, he was president and chief executive officer of HSBC Securities Canada for three years, after working for ten years at CIBC Wood Gundy. He has also worked with Mobil Oil Canada Ltd. for five years and spent two years as a lecturer at the University of Western Ontario, Richard Ivey School of Business.

Awards 
In 2019, Richard was awarded the Lifetime Achievement Award from the Rotman School of Management. He was recognized in 2014 with the Visionary Award by the organization Women in Capital Markets for work during his career on the issue of sponsoring gender-diverse management teams and boards to produce better companies. He also received Queen Elizabeth II, Diamond Jubilee Medal for community service, and the Arbor Award from the University of Toronto for his work with the school.

He lives in Toronto, Ontario, Canada.

References

 Canadian chief executives
 People from Huron County, Ontario
1955 births
 Living people
 Alumni of the London School of Economics
 Canadian Imperial Bank of Commerce
 University of Toronto alumni
 University of Western Ontario alumni
Academic staff of the University of Western Ontario
 Chief executives in the finance industry